Margaret Doyle or Maggie Doyle may refer to:

 Margaret Kennedy (singer) born Margaret Doyle
 Margaret Doyle (announcer) (1920-2002), Australian announcer

Fictional characters
 Margaret 'Maggie' Doyle a fictional character in Australian police show Blue Heelers between 1994 and 2000
 Maggie Doyle, a character in the American hospital series ER